David Gillow (born 16 April 1958) is a Zimbabwean former cyclist. He competed in the individual road race event at the 1980 Summer Olympics. His daughter Shara competed at the 2012 Summer Olympics for Australia.

References

External links
 

1958 births
Living people
Zimbabwean male cyclists
Olympic cyclists of Zimbabwe
Cyclists at the 1980 Summer Olympics
Place of birth missing (living people)